is a Japanese 4-Koma comic strip written by Makoto Fukami and illustrated by Alpha AlfLayla. It was published by Kadokawa Shoten in 4-Koma Nano Ace from April 2011 until the final issue in October 2013, it was then transferred to Young Ace from December 2013 onwards.

Live Action
A live action film based on the comic was directed by Kota Yoshida. It was released on 19 July 2014.

Cast
Noriko Kijima as Yuzuki Mutoh
Haruna Yoshizumi as Aoi Funaki
Yuki Mamiya as Yuuri Kobashi
Mika Yano as Maika Shinzaki

References

External links
 

2010s romance films
Live-action films based on manga
Japanese high school films
Japanese LGBT-related films
Japanese romance films
Lesbian-related films
BDSM in films
2014 films
Manga adapted into films
School life in anime and manga
Seinen manga
2011 manga
Yonkoma
Films directed by Kōta Yoshida
Kadokawa Shoten manga
Kadokawa Dwango franchises
2010s high school films
2010s Japanese films